The General López Department (in Spanish, Departamento General López) is an administrative subdivision (departamento) of the province of Santa Fe, Argentina. It is located in the south of the province. Its head town is Melincué (population 2,200), and its largest city is Venado Tuerto (population 70,000).

It is bordered by the Caseros Department in the north, and by the Constitución Department in the north-east; the rest of its borders coincide with interprovincial limits (with Córdoba in the west and with Buenos Aires in the south and east).

The towns and cities in this department are (in alphabetical order): Aarón Castellanos, Amenábar, Cafferata, Cañada del Ucle, Carmen, Carreras, Chapuy, Chovet, Christophersen, Diego de Alvear, Elortondo, Firmat, Hughes, La Chispa, Labordeboy, Lazzarino, Maggiolo, María Teresa, Melincué, Miguel Torres, Murphy, Rufino, San Eduardo, San Francisco de Santa Fe, San Gregorio, Sancti Spiritu, Santa Isabel, Teodelina, Venado Tuerto, Villa Cañás, Wheelwright.

References
Government of the Province of Santa Fe
Inforama - Municipalities of the General López Department.

External links

 
Departments of Santa Fe Province